The Centenary of Women's Suffrage Gazebo is located in the town of Kondinin, Western Australia. It was built in 1999 to commemorate the centenary of women's suffrage in Western Australia.

References

1999 in Australia
Monuments and memorials to women's suffrage
Monuments and memorials in Western Australia
Gazebos